This is a list of chairpersons of district health boards (DHBs) in New Zealand. District health boards were organisations established by the New Zealand Public Health and Disability Act 2000, responsible for ensuring the provision of health and disability services to populations within a defined geographical area. They existed from 1 January 2001, when the Act came into force, to 30 June 2022. Initially there were 21 DHBs and that reduced to 20 in 2010. Boards were partially appointed by the Minister of Health, and partially elected as part of the country's triennial local elections. The Minister of Health appoints the chairperson and deputy chair, and they were commonly chosen from the people appointed to the board but sometimes, these roles went to elected members. A total of 82 people served as DHB chairpersons; this number does not include commissioners or acting chairs.

Composition of district health boards
DHBs were partially elected and partially appointed. There were up to eleven members on a board. Seven of these members were elected as part of the New Zealand local elections. Up to four members were appointed by the Minister of Health and these appointments generally included the chair and deputy chair, but sometimes these positions were given to elected members. Appointments happened after the local elections and they gave the minister an opportunity to fill skill gaps on the board, e.g. appoint individuals with expertise in finance or with experience in the governance of large organisations. People could apply to the ministry to be appointed.

Inaugural chairpersons
With the exception of four of the twenty-one district health boards, the previous Hospital and Health Service (HHS) board chairs were appointed as the inaugural chair. The Health Minister for the first round of appointments was Annette King and by 21 December 2000, all chairperson appointments were confirmed:

December 2001 appointments
Following the October 2001 local elections where seven board members were elected for each board, Health Minister King announced chairperson appointments on 12 November 2001. Twelve of the twenty-one chairs continued in their role. Two prior chairpersons were assigned to different boards. Of the remaining seven new chairs, five had prior tenure on a district health board, and two were new to DHBs. For three of the incumbents, it was signalled that they would be replaced within the coming term.

Changes during 2001–2004 term
During the local government term, several changes occurred. Michael Ludbrook replaced Ian Wilson as chair of the Waikato DHB in June 2002. Wayne Brown was forced to resign as chair of the Tairāwhiti DHB. He had been appointed as chair for both Auckland and Tairāwhiti, but had also been elected onto the Tairāwhiti board. As an elected member, he was not permitted to also hold a position on another district health board. Rick Bettle left the West Coast DHB at the end of 2002 and after Dr Christine Robertson was acting chairperson for two months, King appointed Professor Gregor Coster as the new chair on 11 February 2003. Peter Glensor replaced Warren Young at the Hutt Valley DHB in June 2003. Gavin Doyle resigned from Whanganui DHB and was replaced by acting chair Patrick O'Connor.

December 2004 appointments
Following the October 2004 local elections King changed only two of the incumbent chairpersons: new chairs were appointed for Nelson Marlborough DHB and for Counties Manukau DHB. Ross Keenan, who stepped down from being chair for Counties Manukau DHB, was appointed deputy chair for the three DHBs covering the Auckland region (Counties Manukau, Auckland and Waitemata) to achieve better collaboration.

Changes during 2004–2007 term
During the local government term, several changes occurred. Alex Grooby, the chair of the Nelson Marlborough DHB, died in July 2005. Pete Hodgson took over as Health Minister from Annette King in October 2005. Hodgson appointed Suzanne Win as successor to Grooby in Nelson Marlborough, effective 1 January 2006. Hodgson appointed Bob Francis to take over as chairperson for Wairarapa DHB from Doug Matheson on 28 November 2006. Dr Judith Aitken replaced Bob Henare for Capital and Coast DHB on 24 December 2006. Dr Patrick O'Connor resigned as chairperson of Whanganui DHB on 1 May 2007 and was replaced by Kate Joblin on 3 May 2007.

December 2007 appointments
The 2007 local elections were held on 13 October. On 31 October 2007, David Cunliffe succeeded Hodgson as Minister of Health. Cunliffe released the list of board chairperson on 14 November 2007, where thirteen got reappointed, two moved to different boards, and four new chairpersons were appointed. Two decisions were left for later. On 14 December, Cunliffe announced businessman John Anderson as the new chairperson for the Capital and Coast DHB, who was to work alongside a Crown Monitor (i.e. a person who observes a board's decision-making, ensures government policy is reflected in board decisions, and who reports directly to the minister). The remaining decision was delayed until 27 February 2008 when Cunliffe sacked the entire board of the Hawke's Bay DHB, alleging that the board had become dysfunctional. Cunliffe appointed Capital and Coast DHB chair John Anderson as a commissioner for the Hawke's Bay DHB.

Changes during 2007–2010 term
During the local government term, several changes occurred. Cunliffe appointed two Crown Monitors to the Whanganui DHB, but left the chairperson in place.

With the 8 November 2008 general election, the Fifth National Government came into power and the role of Health Minister was assigned to Tony Ryall. On 5 December 2008, Southland DHB chair Dennis Cairns foreshadowed his resignation; he chaired his last board meeting on 30 January 2009. In December 2008, Ryall foreshadowed that the board of Hawke's Bay DHB elected in 2007 would be reinstated from February 2009, with the current commissioner John Anderson taking the chairmanship. In February 2009, Kay McKelvie's and Jerry Rickman's resignations as chairpersons of the Waitemata and Waikato DHBs were announced, respectively. Also in February, Ryall sacked the Otago DHB chairperson, Richard Thomson, over a $17 million fraud by staff members and replaced him with immediate effect with Errol Millar. In March 2009, Ryall appointed Paul Menzies as the new chairperson of Southland DHB. In May 2009, Ryall announced Graeme Milne as the new chairperson for Waikato DHB. Dr Lester Levy's appointment as the new chair for the Waitemata DHB was announced in June 2009.

There is a statutory limit of nine years for DHB chairpersons, as defined in the New Zealand Public Health and Disability Act 2000, and several chairs reached this limit at the end of 2009. This affected Northland chair Lynette Stewart, who was replaced by Tony Norman. For the South Canterbury DHB, Joe Butterfield was replaced by Murray Cleverley.

In February 2010, Ryall announced that the Otago and Southland District Health Boards would merge to form the Southern District Health Board, with a combined board of the elected members providing provisional oversight until the local elections in October 2010. The merger came into effect on 1 May 2010, with Errol Millar (ex Otago DHB) as chair and Paul Menzies (ex Southland DHB) as deputy chair. Taranaki DHB chair John Young died on 14 September 2010, a month prior to the next local body election.

December 2010 appointments
The 2010 local elections were held on 9 October. On 22 November 2010, Health Minister Ryall released the list of board chairpersons. Ten new chairpersons were announced and three people (Joe Butterfield, Virginia Hope, and Lester Levy) chaired two boards. It was the first time that a board was elected for the Southern DHB, which had been formed earlier in the year.

There were no changes during the term.

December 2013 appointments
The 2013 local elections were held on 12 October. On 29 November 2013, Health Minister Ryall released the list of board chairpersons. Fourteen chairpersons continued in their role and six new appointments were made. Three people (Murray Cleverley, Virginia Hope, and Lester Levy) chaired two boards.

Changes during 2013–2016 term
In October 2014, the role of Health Minister went from Ryall to Jonathan Coleman. In March 2015, it became known that Coleman intended to replace Southern DHB chair, Joe Butterfield, with a new chair. In May 2015, the government passed the New Zealand Public Health and Disability (Southern DHB) Elections Bill. This allowed it to keep the commissioners for the Southern DHB in place, with no district health board elections held in that area in 2016. In June 2015, Coleman sacked the entire board and replaced them with commissioners.

December 2016 appointments
The 2016 local elections were held on 8 October. On 1 December 2016, Health Minister Coleman released the list of 19 board chairpersons, with Southern DHB still run by a commissioner. Twelve chairpersons continued in their role and seven new appointments were made. Three people (Andrew Blair, Murray Cleverley, and Jenny Margery Black) chaired two boards. Dr Lester Levy was from now in charge of the three DHBs in the Auckland area.

Changes during 2016–2019 term
After Murray Cleverley's February 2017 resignation from the two boards that he chaired, Coleman appointed his successors in August 2017. John Wood was appointed to the Canterbury DHB, and Ron Luxton took over the chairmanship of the South Canterbury DHB.

After the 2017 general election, the Sixth Labour Government of New Zealand formed and David Clark succeeded Coleman as Minister of Health. Lester Levy resigned in December 2017 as chair of all three Auckland region DHBs as he was nearing the statutory limit of service on the Waitematā DHB, where he had been appointed in June 2009. Clark appointed three new chairpersons: Mark Gosche for Counties-Manukau DHB (from 3 May), Patrick Snedden for Auckland DHB (from 1 June), and Judy McGregor for Waitemata DHB (from 10 June). In August 2018, Clark appointed Sally Webb, already the chair of Bay of Plenty DHB, as chairperson for Waikato DHB. At the same time, a Crown Monitor was appointed at Waikato. On 7 May 2019, Clark sacked the board of Waikato DHB and installed Dr Karen Poutasi as a commissioner. Clark also announced that there would be no elections for a new board at the 2019 local elections.

December 2019 appointments
The 2019 local elections were held on 12 October. On 7 December 2019, Health Minister Clark released the list of 19 board chairpersons, with the Waikato DHB under continued control by a commissioner.

Changes during 2019–2022 term
Effective 8 March 2020, Sir Michael Cullen resigned from his chairmanship of the Bay of Plenty DHB after he had been diagnosed with small-cell carcinoma. The deputy chair, Sharon Shea, was appointed acting interim chair. Board member Ron Scott was appointed acting deputy chair. On 13 April 2021, Shea was appointed as permanent chair, with Geoff Esterman appointed as the permanent deputy chair.

List of chairpersons
The following list shows all chairpersons who served on any of the 22 boards that existed between 2001 and 2022.

Notes

References

Chairpersons
2001 establishments in New Zealand
district health board
Chairpersons